Cinema City is an international film festival held annually in Novi Sad, Serbia.

During the eight days of the Festival, Novi Sad becomes a festival city, with abundant film, music, and academic programmes. The programme concept of the Festival consists of three segments – Cinema City Films, PRO, and Music, all of which are carried out across 10 city locations.

Programme 

The festival includes film, music, and academic programming, which take place at more than 10 locations in Novi Sad.

Cinema City Films is the main part of the festival, screening over 100 independent films every year. This programme is particularly focused on young film authors from the country, the region and the world. Competition selections include National Class, which screens best domestic achievements; Up to 10,000 bucks, which screens low-budget films from all over the globe; and Fresh Danube Films, which presents choice selection of best debut and second films signed by authors from the Danube region. The film programme also includes review selections, which every year honour different domestic and foreign directors and cinemas, Planet Rock selection for screening the best music documentaries, 360° for presenting the latest achievements of international indie production, Cinema City Shorts, and special screenings. Films by programme selections

PRO selection of the Cinema City festival is intended for film authors and professionals from the country and the region. Its objective is to support education and networking and cooperation between the people who are the present and the future of domestic and regional cinema. This selection combines two parallel directions of film production in Serbia – domestic film production and foreign production service. The PRO selection is composed of Cinema City Campus– an educational programme for young film authors and professionals from Serbia and the region, and Cinema City Industry – a platform for networking between professionals and for raising issues of special significance for domestic cinema.

Cinema City Music is the part of the festival that organizes opening and closing parties, concerts and accompanying music events during the festival, which has so far seen some of the most important domestic and foreign DJs and musicians. A special segment of the music programme is PLANET ROCK FESTIVAL, which is a result of cooperation between the Cinema City Association and HNS Creative. Planet Rock is an interdisciplinary festival, which aims to integrate several segments of alternative culture. The vision of this project is to provide an original film and music platform in order to generate the framework for positioning Novi Sad as a new, creative entertainment centre that stimulates alternative and progressive authors. Cinema City Music

Competition 

National class presents achievements of national cinematography and premieres. All the films from this selection are competing for Cinema City awards. The festival will be host to many domestic film authors and film crews.

Fresh Danube Films The main objective of the Fresh Danube Films is to promote and support cultural diversity and creative synergy of cinematographies alongside Danube river.  This program is a creative result of the last year project which was supported by the European Cultural Foundation.

Up to 10,000 bucks encompasses films made with the budget of less than $10,000. Authors from around the world have applied for this competition.

History

As of 2010, the Cinema City festival has been independently organized by the Cinema City Association. The organizational structure is presented through the Board of Directors and the Council of the festival, as well as a number of associates and friends who work throughout the year on development and organization of the festival and other projects of cultural significance. This festival is based on the concept of a festival city, which was promoted at Serbia Film Festival in 2007. Exit Association took over the organization of the festival in 2008, and introduced significant changes in the programme concept. During 2008 and 2009, Cinema City developed into an international film festival, which, through its scope, film programme and distinguished guests from around the world, represents an important cultural and film event for Serbia and the region. In 2010, the organization of the Cinema City festival was assumed by the Cinema City Association, which continues to nurture and develop the festival in terms of both concept and infrastructure.

Guests
Guests of the festival in 2008 and 2009 were Guillermo Arriaga, who won the award for best screenplay at Cannes in 2005, winner of the Tribeca Film Festival in New York – Lance Hammer, the first Serbian winner at Sarajevo Film Festival – Vladimir Perišić, as well as domestic and regional film icons such as Miki Manojlović, Goran Paskaljević, Emir Kusturica, Pjer Žalica, Despina Mauzaki... A special guest of the 2010 Festival was the famous American actress and singer – Juliette Lewis, who performed with her bend at Cinema City music opening on June 5, 2010. Over 80,000 people visited Cinema City, and clear skies, warm weather, and quality programme certainly contributed to a great number of visitors at open-air cinemas, which are one of the strongest points of the Cinema City festival. The audience was also greatly interested in the guest appearance of the Iraqi director, Mohamed Al-Daradji. Cinema City 2011 presented some of the most significant contemporary authors from the world of independent film. Guests of the Festival, in whose honor Cinema City organized screenings of a number of retrospectives, were the Hungarian director Béla Tarr, Lithuanian author Šarūnas Bartas, and Polish director Dorota Kędzierzawska. Cinema City played host to the Board of the European Film Academy and numerous directors, producers, screenwriters, actors, and film professionals such Nick Powell, Bruno Chatelin, Laurence Herszberg, Andreas Dresen, and many film stars from Serbia and the region. Domestic film authors also caused great interest, as well as young film artists, the future of domestic cinematography. Official website

Jury

2014:
The Jury National Class: Loïc Magneron, Raymond Phathanavirangoon, Peter Stumbur
The Jury Up to 10,0000 Bucks: Sarita Matijević, Nikola Majdak Jr., Dean Radovanović
The Jury Fresh Danube Films: David González
The MTV Jury: Aleksandar Ilić, Boris Miljković
The Jury FIPRESCI Serbia: Milan D. Špiček, Boris Gigov, Dejan Dabić
2013:
The Jury National Class: Katrin Gebbe, Marek Rozenbaum, Chad Chenouga
The Jury Up to 10,000 Bucks: Brankica Drašković, Vladimir Crnjanski, Uroš Tomić
2012:
The Jury National Class: Laurence Herszberg, Davide Manuli, Mary Nazari,Lorena Pavlič, Martin Schweighofer
The Jury Exit Point: Fridrik Thór Fridriksson,Simon Perry, Jean Roy, Mira Staleva, Will Tizard
The Jury Hungry Days: Will Tizard, João Pedro Rodrigues, Zvonimir Jurić, Santiago Fillol
The Jury Up to 10,000 Bucks: Rajko Petrović, Nevena Matović, Irena Škorić
2011:
The Jury Exit Point: Dorota Kędzierzawska, Sergey Lavrentiev, Ana Maria Rossi, Igor Sterk, Visar Vishka
The Jury National Class: Philippe Azoury, Sharunas Bartas, Jan Cvitkovič, Eva Hubert, Beki Probst
The Jury Up to 10,000 bucks: Nikola Ljuca, Vladimir Paskaljevic, Damir Todorovic
2010:
The Jury Exit Point: Canan Gerede, Guy Jacques, Ninos-Fenek Mikelidis, Steffen Wink, Kalina Kovacevic
The Jury National Class: Dejan Acimovic, Thure Munkholm, Kirill Razlogov, Jelka Stergel, Albert Wiederspiel
The Jury Up 10,000 bucks: Gauthier Morax, Ognjen Glavonic, Dunja Kusturica
2009:
The Jury Exit Point: Tuncel Kurtiz, Martin Blaney, Ivan Fila, Labina Mitevska, Ellis Driessen
The Jury National Class and Up to 10,000 bucks: Pjer Zalica, Ludovic Chavarot, Srdjan Koljevic, Iliana Kitanova, Padraic Delaney
The Jury FIPRESCI Serbia: Sandra Perovic, Vladimir Crnjanski, Stasa Jamusakov
2008:
The Jury Exit Point and National Class: Radan Popovic, Despina Mouzaki, Dom Rotheroe, Peter van Bueren, Thomas Poulard
The Jury Up to 10,000 bucks Jury: Igor M. Toholj, Marija Perovic, Sasa Radojevic

Awards

Festival’s award Ibis, was named after a bird, whose habitat is in the Danube area not far from the festival’s base. According to folklore, Ibis is the last creature in the wild which looks for cover from bad weather, but is also the first to reappear after it, thus revealing itself as the messenger of beautiful weather. It is made by Serbian sculptor Nikola Pešić.

2014

Grand Prix ("National class" program): "The Disobedient" by Mina Đukić
Best directing ("National class" program): Mina Đukić "The Disobedient"
Best actor ("National class" program): Muhamed Dupovac "So Hot Was the Cannon"
Best actress ("National class" program): Hana Selimović "The Disobedient"
Special Mentions ("National class" program): "Nymph" by Milan Todorović and "The Undertaker" by Dragan Nikolić
Best film ("Up to 10,000 Bucks" program): "Stray Dogs" by Atanu Mukherjee
Special Mentions ("Up to 10,000 Bucks" program): "Goran" by Roberto Santaguida and "Emergency Exit" by Vladimir Tagić
Best film ("Fresh Danube Films" program): "Free Entry" by Yvonne Kerékgyártó
THE SERBIAN FIPRESCI SECTION:
Best film ("National class" program): "So Hot Was the Cannon" by Boban Skerlić
Best film ("Fresh Danube Films" program): "Velvet Terrorists" by Pavol Pekarčík, Ivan Ostrochovský, and Peter Kerekes
MTV AWARD:
Best regional music video: Stefan Đorđević for his music video for "Wahine" by Threesome.

2013

Grand Prix ("National class" program): "Circles" by Srdan Golubović
Best directing ("National class" program): Bojan Vuk Kosovčević "Whirlpool"
Best screenplay ("National class" program): Goran Marković and Tihomir Stanić "
Best actor ("National class" program): Nebojša Glogovac for his roles in "CIRCLES" and "ARTILLERYMAN"
Best actress ("National class" program): Dara Džokić "Whitering"
Special Jury Prize went to Kosta Đorđević, director of "Trolling", actress Hristina Popović ("Circles"), actor Nikola Rakočević ("Circles", "Trolling") and students from the Faculty of Drama Arts in Belgrade, Aron Sekel, Raško Milatović, Miloš Milovanović, Nemanja Vojnović, Petar Ristovski, Tea Lukač, Marko Đorđević and Luka Popadić for the screenplay and direction of "WHERE IS NADIA?"
Best film ("Up to 10,000 Bucks" program):"Either Words Nor Quiet" Dean Radovanović
Special Jury Prize for animated film ("Up to 10,000 Bucks" program): "Comeback" Jelena Oroz
Special Jury Prize to actors ("Up to 10,000 Bucks" program): Milica Trifunović and Mladen Sovilj "Real Good Paneling"
Audience Award ("Exit Point" program): "A Letter to My Father" Damir Čučić

2012

Grand Prix ("National class" program): "Clip" by Maja Milos
Best directing ("National class" program): Miroslav Momčilović "Death of a Man in Balkans"
Best screenplay ("National class" program): Miroslav Momčilović "Death of a Man in Balkans"
Best actress ("National class" program): Nada Šargin "Practical Guide to Belgrade with Singing and Crying"
Best actor ("National class" program): Emir Hadžihafizbegović "Death of a Man in Balkans"
Special recognition goes to "Redemption Street" for superb cinematography
Audience Award ("National class program"): "The Parade" by Srđan Dragojević
Best film ("Exit Point" program): "Unfair World" by Filippos Tsitos
Best film ("Hungry Days" program): "Neighbouring Sounds" by Kleber Mendoça Filho
Best film ("Up to 10,000 Bucks" program): "Mirage" by Srđan Keča
Best Serbian film ("Up to 10,000 Bucks" program):"The Other Shore" by Marko Đorđević
Best Hungarian film ("Up to 10,000 Bucks" program): "Half Past Nine" by Anikó Urbán
Special recognition for the best documentary goes to Polish film KAMP by Tomasz Jeziorski
Special recognition for directing goes to the film "Stevan M. Živković" by Vladimir Tagić 
Special recognition for director of photography Ivan Marković in film "Fragments"
Serbian branch of FIPRESCI international federation of film critics, with jury members: Ivana Kronja, Nenad Dukić, Dejan Petrović
Presents Critics’ Prize to:
Exit Point selection, Simon Kaijser da Silva for Stockholm East
National Class selection, Bojan Vuletić for Practical Guide to Belgrade with Singing and Crying
Serbian selection of international federation of film critics FIPRESCI with jury members: Milan D. Špiček, Boris Gigov and Vladimir Džudović
Presents Critics’ Prize to:
National Class selection: Death of a Man in Balkans, by Miroslav Momčilović
Exit Point selection: Collaborator, by Martin Donovan

2011

Grand Prix ("National class" program): "Tilva Ros" by Nikola Lezaic
Best directing ("National class" program): Oleg Novkovic "White White World"
Best screenplay ("National class" program): Nikola Lezaic "Tilva Ros"
Best actor ("National class" program): Nikola Rakocevic "Skinning"
Best actress ("National class" program): Jasna Djuricic "White White World"
Best photography ("National class" program): Dusan Joksimovic "The Enemy"
Best editing ("National class" program): Aleksandra Milovanovic "Cinema Komunisto"
Best original score ("National class" program): Boris Kovac "White White World"
Best scenography ("National class" program): Zorana Petrov "The Enemy"
Best costume ("National class" program): Lana Pavlovic "The Enemy"
Special award ("National class" program): omnibus "October"
Best film ("Exit Point" program): "Kawasaki's Rose" by Jan Hrebejk
Best directing ("Exit Point" program): Bogdan George Apetri "Outbound"
Best actor ("Exit Point" program): Brian Brown "Limbo"
Best actress ("Exit Point" program): Ana Ularu "Outbound"
Special award ("Exit Point" program): "Cerro Bayo" by Victoria Galardi
Best film ("Up to 10,000 bucks" program): "March 9th" by Irena Skoric
Special recognition for the best acting performance ("Up to 10,000 bucks" program): Visnja Obradovic "Golden League"
Special recognition for socially significant documentary ("Up 10,000 bucks" program): "Trials, Tribulations & Sustainable Growth of a Cock" by Vladimir Perovic
Special recognition for a funny and provocative documentary ("Up to 10,000 bucks" program): "Reality, fuck off" by Nemanja Vojinović
 Honorary Award for his outstanding achievement as actor: Bata Živojinović
Audience Award: "Cinema Komunisto" by Mila Turajlic
FIPRESCI jury awards:
the best feature ("Exit Point" program): "Tamara Drewe" by Stephen Frears
the best film ("National class" program): "How I Was Stolen by the Germans" by Miša Radivojević
FEDEORA jury awards:
film "The Enemy" by Dejan Zecevic ("National class" program)
film "Mothers" by Milcho Manchevski ("Balkan Box" program)
The Serbian branch of FIPRESCI awards:
film "The Show Must Go On" by Nevio Marasovic
special mention "Abandoned" by Adis Bakrac

2010

Grand Prix ("Exit Point" program): "Winter’s Bone" directed by Debra Granik
Best directing ("Exit Point" program): Chuan Lu "City of Life and Death"
Best actor ("Exit Point" program): Emir Kusturica "Farewell"
Best actress ("Exit Point" program): Lola Duenas "Me Too"
Special recognition ("Exit Point program"): Mohamed Al-Daradji "Son of Babylon"
Best film ("National class" program): "The Woman with a Broken Nose" by Srdjan Koljevic
Best directing ("National class" program): Sasa Hajdukovic, "32nd of December"
Best screenplay ("National class" program): Srdjan Koljevic, "The Woman with a Broken Nose"
Best actor ("National Class" program): Nebojsa Glogovac, "The Woman with a Broken Nose"
Best actress ("National Class" program): Nikolina Djorodjevic, "32nd of December"
Special recognition for artistic contribution: Vlastimir Velisavljevic, "Devil's Town"
Best film ("Up to 10,000 bucks" program): "Thursday" by Nikola Ljuca
Special recognition for directing ("Up to 10,000 bucks" program): Dane Komljen, "I already am everything I want to have"
Special recognition for original approach ("Up to 10,000 bucks" program): Louise BotkayCourcier, "Useless Landscape"
Special recognition for a promising director ("Up to 10,000 bucks" program): Zoran Tairovic, "Little Red Riding Hood"
Audience award for best film: "The Woman with a Broken Nose" by Srdjan Koljevic

2009

Best film ("National class" program): "Obični ljudi" by Vladimir Perišić
Directing ("National class" program): Srđan Dragojević "Sveti Georgije ubiva aždahu"
Script ("National class" program): Miroslav Momčilović "Čekaj me, ja sigurno neću doći"
Editing ("National class" program): Petar Marković "Sveti Georgije ubiva aždahu"
Cinematography ("National class" program): Aleksandar Ramadanović "Jesen u mojoj ulici"
Leading male performance ("National class" program): Lazar Ristovski "Sveti Georgije ubiva aždahu"
Leading female performance ("National class" program): Mirjana Karanović "Tamo i ovde"
Special prize ("National class" program): „Jesen u mojoj ulici“ by Miloš Pušić
Up to 10.000 Bucks category: "Živan Pujić Jimmy" by Ognjen Glavonić
"Exit Point" program Grand Prix: "Toni Manero" directed by Pablo Lareno
Audience award for best film: "Technotise: Edit & I" by Aleksa Gajić
Special contribution to Serbian cinematography: "Technotise: Edit & I" by Aleksa Gajić

2008

Grand prix of the festival: "Ballast" (director: Lance Hammer)
Best film (Serbian film): "Ljubav i drugi zločini" Stefan Arsenijević
Directing (Serbian film): Dejan Zečević "Četvrti čovek"
Script (Serbian film): Nebojša Romčević "Na lepom plavom Dunavu"
Editing (Serbian film): Marko Glušac "Četvrti čovek"
Cinematography (Serbian film): Miloš Kodemo "Miloš Branković"
Original music (Serbian film): Boris Kovač "Na lepom plavom Dunavu"
Leading male performance (Serbian film): Nikola Kojo "Četvrti čovek"
Leading female performance (Serbian film): Ana Franić "Na lepom plavom Duvanu"
Up to 10.000 Bucks category: "Uspavanka za dečaka" by Miloš Pušić
Special contribution to contemporary film expression: "The Amazing Truth About Qeen Raquela" by Olaf de Fleur Johannesson

2007

Best movie - Grand prix: "Bel epok" (director: Nikola Stojanović)
Best directing: Sabolč Tolnai
Script: Uglješa Šajtinac/ Dejan Nikolaj Kraljačić
Cinematography: Milad Tauk
Original music: Arsen Dedić
Leading male performance: Kenedi Hasani
Leading female performance: Vita Mavrič
Supporting male performance: Petar Božović
Supporting female performance: Milena Vasić Ražnatović
Editing: Aleksandar Rajković
Sound design: Lukas Grgozevski
Scene design: Miodrag Nikolić
Costume design: Jelena Petrović
Make- up: Milena Stefanović/ Tamara Spasojević
Best movie - Eurimages programme: "Trans" by Tereze Vilaverde

See also
List of film festivals in Europe
List of Serbian films

References

External links
 Official website
 Variety
 Deutsche Welle
 Dnevnik

Film festivals in Serbia
Serbian film awards
Culture of Vojvodina